Anna Frants (born 1 October 1965 in Leningrad, Soviet Union) is an American multimedia artist, curator, and art collector. She is the founder of nonprofit cultural foundation "St. Petersburg Arts Project" and "CYLAND" MediaArtLab, and is director of "Frants Gallery" (New York, United States).

Biography 
In 1989, Frants graduated from the St. Petersburg Stieglitz State Academy of Art and Design (formerly the Vera Mukhina Leningrad Higher School of Art and Industry), where she had majored in Industrial Design. In 1992, she was admitted to the New-York Pratt Institute to the department of Art and Design where she majored in Computer Graphics and Animation.

The mastering of computer graphics and animation marked the beginning of her enthusiasm for new media, new media art and technologies in art and the concentration of her interests on the transition from traditional classical methods to cyberarts that was afforded unlimited possibilities by the rapidly developing internet.

In 1997, she married Leonid Frants. Their son Daniil became the youngest artist at CYLAND MediaArtLab: when he was only twelve, he created, as part of Cyfest, an international educational game program for children, the workshop "Humanizing Robots", which he held in Russia, Germany, Japan, United States and Ukraine.

In addition to continuous exhibition activities as an artist and a curator in New York, St. Petersburg, Europe and Japan, in 2010, Anna traveled to the Polar Region as a member of the international group of artists within the program "The Arctic Circle" organized by the Canadian government. The program's purpose was to afford the artists an opportunity to visit hard-to-reach places of the Polar Region that are mostly known through scientific reports, which would subsequently allow them to create art projects based on their impressions of the region. In addition to the video footage filmed by Anna, that trip resulted in her interactive project Trembling Creatures, exhibited at the group show of participants of those annual expeditions that opened in May 2014 at the "1285 Avenue of the Americas Art Gallery" in New York.

Selected exhibitions 
 Weather Forecast: Digital Cloudiness - Reggia di Caserta, Italy, 2018.
 Personal Spaces – Interactive Multimedia Works by Anna Frants, Carla Gannis, Alexandra Dementieva, Elena Gubanova and Ivan Govorkov. National Arts Club, 15 Gramercy Park South, New York,  2018
 HYBRIS, Monsters and Hybrids in Contemporary Art, University Ca’ Foscari, Venice, 2017].
 Patterns of the Mind, Convergence, London, 2016.
 Nargifsus, Transfer Gallery, New York, 2016.
 Made in Ancient Greece, Sergey Kuryokhin Center for Contemporary Art, St. Petersburg, 2016.
 The Other Home, Made in NY Media Center by IFP, New York, 2015.
 Urbi et Orbi, as part of the 6th Moscow Biennale of Contemporary Art, RGGU, Moscow, 2015.
 Personal Space #1, Youth Center at the State Hermitage, St. Petersburg, 2015.
 Re: Collection, Museum of Arts and Design, New York, 2014.
 Magnetic North, The UBS Art Gallery, New York, 2014.
 Finding Freedom in Russian Art, 1961-2014, Paul & Lulu Hilliard University Art Museum, Lafayette, USA, 2014.
 This Leads to Fire, Neuberger Museum of Art, Purchase, New York, 2014.
 Capital of Nowhere, 2013.
 VISIONARY DREAMS # 3261-64", 2013.
 The Time Keeper, State Hermitage, 2013.
 CYFEST Exhibition, 2012.
 Migrants, 5th Moscow Biennale of Contemporary Art, 2013.
 The Time Keeper, 2012.
 Trembling Creatures, SIGGRAPH ASIA, 2011, Hong Kong.

Selective artworks 
 "No. 0"  —  Multimedia installation in public space.
 Made in Ancient Greece], Series of works (5 objects from this series are in the collection of the Museum of Arts and Design in New York).
 In the Shade of Olive Tree]  —  in the collection of Kyosei-no-Sato Museum (Japan).
 Polar Bear Fodder.
 Trembling Creatures.
The last two works were made as a result of the trip to the Polar circle as a member of the Canadian art expedition "The Arctic Circle" in 2009.
Artworks by Anna Frants are presented by Borey Gallery (St. Petersburg, Russia), Dam Stuhltrager Gallery (New York, United States, and Berlin, Germany) and Barbarian Gallery (Zurich, Switzerland). Her works are in the collections of the New York Museum of Arts and Design, State Russian Museum, Kyosei-no-Sato Museum (Japan), Kolodzei Art Foundation, Sergey Kuryokhin Center for Contemporary Art and in numerous private collections all over the world.

Curatorial activities 
The most notable of Frants' curatorial works were the retrospective exhibitions "Sterligov's Group", 2006, New York, and "Art around the Barracks", 2003, New York.

In the documentary of Andrey Zagdansky "Konstantin and Mouse", dedicated to Konstantin Kuzminsky, one of the episodes was filmed at the opening night of "Art around the Barracks" at Frants Gallery in Soho.

Among contemporary artists, who constantly collaborate with Anna Frants as a curator, are Vitaly Pushnitsky, Elena Gubanova and Ivan Govorkov, Alexander Kozhin, Alexander Terebenin, Marina Koldobskaya, Alexandra Dementieva, Peter Belyi, Petr Shvetsov.

CYLAND MediaArtLab 

In 2006, Anna Frants together with Колдобская, Марина Дмитриевна|Marina Koldobskaya founded the international media lab "СYLAND".

Since 2007, the MediaArtLab holds the annual festival of cyberart "Cyfest", the largest cyberart festival in Eastern Europe featuring artists from different countries who share an enthusiasm for new technologies.

Nonprofit foundation "St. Petersburg Arts Project" 
In 1999, Anna and Leonid Frants created the nonprofit foundation "St. Petersburg Arts Project" that is still active. Its purpose was the representation in New York of the artists from Leningrad/St. Petersburg who have been working there from the postwar 1950s until the present time. The primary focus was on the so-called Leningrad underground — the unique and underexplored cultural phenomenon of the 1970s and the artistic and social environment that brought if forth.

Gradually, the scope of activities of "Frants Gallery Space" expanded and started including not just the traditional genres, such as painting, sculpture and graphics, but also the art associated with the latest technologies: cyberart, video art, computer animation, interactive installations as well as performance art.

Collection 
The collection's creation was a natural extension of the development of "St. Petersburg Arts Project". Since 1998, Anna and Leonid Frants have been collecting works of visual arts of Leningrad underground. Their current collection also includes sculptures, assemblages, photographs, videos, objects of actual art and archival materials.

In January 2013, the Department of Contemporary Art at the Hermitage Museum organized, as a part of the project "Actual Art of St. Petersburg, A Retrospective", the exhibition "Simple Rules". It showcased works from Russian and foreign private collections.

References

Sources 
 Technology of the Cyber-beauty — Anna Frants and Lena Sokol. NY Arts Magazine.
 Anna Frants // Venice Conference 2017.
 Is it All Quiet on the Cyber Front? — Anna Frants and Elena Sokol. NY Arts Magazine.
 People: Interview with curator Anna Frants at Venice Biennial 2015 // Chased. Magazin für Kunst, Ausstellungen, Vernissagen in Berlin. July 12. 2015.
 St. Petersburg holds the festival of contemporary art Cyfest for the third time — TV Channel 1, 2009.
 The Time Keeper. A traveling group exhibition — Digicult.
 The Time Keeper — Be-In.
 The Time Keeper. Una mostra di gruppo itinerante Feed dei commenti // DIGICULT. Digital Art, Design and Culture. 2012.06.12.

External links
 Франц, Анна Александровна // Википедия.
 Anna Frants Site.
 Foundation St. Petersburg Arts Project.
 CYLAND MediaArtLab.
 Cyfest Festival.
 Frants Gallery Space.

1965 births
Living people
Curators from Saint Petersburg
Saint Petersburg Stieglitz State Academy of Art and Design alumni
Pratt Institute alumni
American art collectors
Russian art collectors
Women art collectors
American art curators
American women curators
20th-century art collectors
21st-century art collectors
20th-century Russian painters
21st-century Russian painters
20th-century American painters
21st-century American painters
Russian women painters
American women animators
Russian women animators
American animators
Russian animators
Russian contemporary artists
Women video artists
American video artists
Russian video artists
American multimedia artists
20th-century American women artists
21st-century Russian women artists
21st-century American women
American contemporary painters
20th-century Russian women